Haji Ilyas, better known as Shamsuddin Ilyas Shah, was the founder of the Sultanate of Bengal and its inaugural Ilyas Shahi dynasty; with a brief gap of 21 years in the early 15th-century, the Ilyas Shahi Dynasty ruled for 145 years (1342-1487).

Born in Sistan, and a follower of Sunni Islam, Ilyas Shah rose through the ranks of the Delhi Sultanate. In the early 14th-century, the Delhi Sultanate divided Bengal into three provinces based in the towns of Satgaon in South Bengal, Sonargaon in East Bengal, and Lakhnauti in North Bengal. The purpose was to improve administration as Delhi's sway over Bengal weakened. Ilyas Shah was appointed Governor of Satgaon. In the middle of the 14th-century, the governors of the three city-states declared independence. The three city-states began warring against one another. Ilyas Shah eventually defeated the ruler of Lakhnauti, Alauddin Ali Shah, and the ruler of Sonargaon, Ikhtiyaruddin Ghazi Shah. He unified Bengal into an independent sultanate, establishing his capital in Pandua.

As Sultan, Ilyas Shah waged a war against the Delhi Sultanate to secure recognition of Bengal's independence. He raided cities across the eastern part of the subcontinent, becoming the first Muslim ruler to invade the Kathmandu Valley. Eventually, he reached an agreement with Delhi to pay an annual tribute in return for a cessation of hostilities.

Personal life and family
He was of Turkic origin.There are conflicting views on whether Ilyas was born in Sistan or not, although it is agreed that his origins definitely lay in the Sistan region of what is today eastern Iran and southern Afghanistan. According to Syed A M R Haque, it was his predecessors who had first arrived to the subcontinent, as Muslim missionaries, and the family were granted jagirs by the Delhi Sultanate in Bengal in 1227. Ilyas was a Sunni Muslim by faith.

According to a narrative by Durgachandra Sanyal, Ilyas was on his way to Sonargaon when he married a Bengali Brahmin widow from Bajrayogini, Bikrampur that had embraced Islam and taken the name Phulmati Begum, and they later had two sons and several daughters including Prince Sikandar. Sanyal adds that the marriage was initially protested by upper-class Brahmins due to the fact that widow remarriage was impermissible in Hinduism. Nevertheless, Ilyas proceeded with the nikah as he could not allow the girl to live as an outcast in her society or fall into harlotry. This narrative is supported by Dinesh Chandra Sen. However, many reputed historians such as R. D. Banerji and Ahmad Hasan Dani have refuted Sanyal's narrative, due to no historical sources being cited other than quotes from a certain "Mir Farazand Husayn'''", who is unheard of in the Muslim chronicles for Indian history. Dani considers Sanyal's narrative to be imaginary, and simply an attempt to glorify the history of the Sanyal and Bhaduri Brahmins of Varendra. Banerji questioned whether Sanyal had ever read previous history books before writing his book as it had several mistakes regarding the members and history of the Ilyas Shahi dynasty. Citing Nalini Kanta Bhattasali, Abdul Karim also mentions that Ilyas married a Hindu woman according to tradition, without mentioning her name as Fulmati.

Unification of Bengal

Ilyas worked under the service of the Delhi Sultanate, though it is not confirmed if he was positioned in Bengal from the start. Some have claimed that Ilyas was originally based in Delhi and moved to Bengal after problems arose, while others claim that his family had migrated to Bengal long before. According to Banglapedia, Ilyas was initially working under Malik Firuz in Delhi. Nevertheless, Ilyas eventually served under Izzuddin Yahya, the imperial provincial governor of Satgaon in present-day South Bengal.

Following Yahya's death in 1338, Ilyas declared himself as the independent Sultan of Satgaon, with the title of Shams ad-Din.  He then waged a long war from 1339 to 1352 against Sultan Alauddin Ali Shah of Lakhnauti (North Bengal) and Sultan Ikhtiyaruddin Ghazi Shah of Sonargaon (East Bengal). Ilyas Shah emerged victorious after conquering Lakhnauti and Sonargaon in 1342 and 1352 respectively. He then proclaimed the establishment of the Sultanate of Bengal in 1352 through the unification of these regions, moving his capital to Pandua, not far from Lakhnauti in northern Bengal. The area was the former capital of the Gaur kings and Pala emperors. This territory now became known as "Bangālah" or "Mulk-i-Bangālah". He was known as "Shāh-i-Bangālah" during his tenure, and the people living in this region were formally given the name of "Bengali".

Government
Ilyas Shah displayed an egalitarian attitude towards his subjects; his administration was known for its equality and acceptance of members from different religious, caste, social, and ethnic communities. He standardised the people of Bengal under the banner of one politico-social and linguistic platform, including the Bengali language. The region received immigrants from across the Muslim world, including North Indians, Turks, Abyssinians, Arabs and Persians.

Military Campaigns

As the ruler of Satgaon, Ilyas Shah led the very first Muslim army into Nepal. He first occupied the Tirhut region, which he divided into two parts. The part north of the Budhi Gandaki River were restored to Raja Kameshwar Thakur of the Oiniwar dynasty, while Ilyas kept the southern part for himself, stretching from Begusarai to Nepal Terai. Its headquarters was situated in the village of Ukkacala (later known as Hajipur in his honour), where Ilyas had constructed a large fort and urbanised the area. Ilyas then thrust through the Terai plains with his army, into the Kathmandu Valley ruled by Jayaraja Deva. His army sacked the temple of Swayambhunath and looted Kathmandu city for three days, returning to Bengal with plentiful spoils.

Ilyas Shah then invaded Orissa, which was ruled by Bhanudeva II of the Eastern Ganga dynasty. He further sacked Jajpur, Cuttack and reached as far as the Chilika Lake. The Jagannath Temple was also desecrated during the invasion. He also led a successful campaign against the Kamarupa kingdom in present-day Assam, being the first Muslim king to capture Guwahati. Ilyas Shah also founded the city of Hajipur and first settled in 1350 AD.

In November 1353, the Delhi Sultan Firuz Shah Tughluq launched an invasion of Bengal. His army occupied Pandua. Ilyas Shah and his forces retreated to the fortress of Ekdala. The Delhi Sultan laid siege to the fortress for two months. The Delhi Sultanate's forces then began withdrawing. Ilyas Shah began to pursue the Delhi army and reached as far as Varanasi. The Delhi army formidably fought back. Firuz Shah returned to Delhi in 1355. Ilyas Shah regained control of Bengal and his realm extended up to the Koshi River.

The extent of Ilyas Shah's campaigns, including his conquest of major Indian cultural centers, was considered "world-conquering" in the context of medieval India. This led to him being styled as "the second Alexander" in the same manner as Alauddin Khalji.

Death
Ilyas Shah died on January 1358, and was buried in Ukkacala. In honour of his efforts in fortifying and urbanising Ukkacala, the city was renamed to Hajipur'' (city of the Haji). During the reign of Mughal emperor Akbar, the Governor of Bihar Said Khan's brother Makhsus Shah constructed a congregational mosque within Ilyas Shah's fort in 1587. Presently, a mazar (mausoleum) on SDO Road is attributed to the former Sultan, and lies adjacent to the Haji Ilyaas Park (also named after him). The tomb is respected by both Muslims and Hindus, who hold a mela every year during his urs.

See also
 History of Bengal
 List of rulers of Bengal

References

1358 deaths
Sultans of Bengal
14th-century Indian Muslims
Year of birth unknown
14th-century Indian monarchs
Ilyas Shahi dynasty
Hajipur